DHL International Aviation ME (Correct name DHL Aviation EEMEA B.S.C. (C), and sometimes branded as SNAS/DHL) is a cargo airline based in Bahrain. It employs 265 airline professionals to dispatch, fly and maintain a fleet of Boeing 767 freighters operating under a Bahraini AOC. Their mission is to provide safe, on time and reliable air services to their customers. DHL International is the central platform for DHL Air Network Operations in the Middle East. It is wholly owned by Deutsche Post and operates the group's DHL-branded parcel and express services in the Middle East and North Africa as part of DHL Aviation. Its main base is Bahrain International Airport.

History
The airline began dedicated cargo flights between Bahrain and Riyadh in 1979 with a Fokker F27 Friendship. In 1980, with demand for a reliable overnight service increasing, the Fairchild Metro were introduced. With its fast cruising speed of 250 knots, this aircraft proved to be ideal for this type of service and destinations soon expanded to include Dubai, Kuwait and Jeddah. In 2004, larger jet aircraft were introduced with the deployment of 6 Boeing 727s. The Middle East is today connected into DHL's network via dedicated long haul flights from the US, Europe and Asia.

Destinations

Fleet

Current fleet

As of December 2022, the DHL International fleet consists of the following aircraft:

Former fleet
DHL International formerly operated the following aircraft:
Boeing 727-200F
Boeing 757-200PCF
Boeing 757-200SF
Convair CV-540
Fairchild Metro 23
Fairchild Metro III
Fokker F27 Friendship

Accidents and incidents  
2002 Überlingen mid-air collision: On July 1, 2002, DHL Flight 611, a Boeing 757-200PF (registered as A9C-DHL) was flying from Bergamo, Italy, to Brussels, Belgium. The aircraft was flying over southern Germany when it collided with a BAL Bashkirian Airlines Tupolev Tu-154M on a charter flight from Moscow, Russia to Barcelona, Spain, over the city of Überlingen near the German-Swiss border. The DHL plane’s tail slammed into the fuselage of the Tu-154. The collision killed the 2 crew members on board the Boeing 757, and all 69 passengers and crew on the Tupolev, mostly Russian schoolchildren from Bashkortostan on a vacation, organized by the local UNESCO committee, to the Costa Dorada region of Spain.

See also
List of airlines of Bahrain

References

External links

Official website of DHL
Four Decades of Success: The DHL and Bahrain Airport Story

Airlines of Bahrain
Cargo airlines of Bahrain
Airlines established in 1979
DHL
Bahraini companies established in 1979